Jenny Watson may refer to:
 Jenny Watson (civil servant)
 Jenny Watson (artist)